Tai Loi, also known as Mong Lue, refers to various Palaungic languages spoken mainly in Burma, with a few hundred in Laos and some also in China. Hall (2017) reports that Tai Loi is a cover term meaning 'mountain Tai' in Shan, and refers to various Angkuic, Waic, and Western Palaungic languages rather than a single language or branch. The Shan exonym Tai Loi can refer to:

Western Palaungic branch: De'ang
Lametic branch: Lamet
Angkuic branch: Muak Sa-aak, Mok
Waic branch
Wa: Meung Yum, Savaiq, etc.
Plang: Phang, Kontoi, Pang Pung, etc.

Additionally, Ethnologue (21st edition), citing Schliesinger (2003), lists Doi as a Tai Loi variety in Ban Muang, Sing District, Luang Namtha Province, Laos as a nearly extinct language variety spoken by an ethnic group comprising 600 people and 80 households as of 2003. Schliesinger (2003) reports that elderly Doi speakers can understand the Samtao language.

References

Hall, Elizabeth. 2017. On the Linguistic Affiliation of 'Tai Loi'. JSEALS vol. 10.2:xix-xxii.

Palaungic languages
Languages of China